Chhatrapati Shahu Maharaj Terminus (officially Shri Chhatrapati Shahu Maharaj Terminus) (station code: KOP) is the main railway terminus in the city of Kolhapur, India. It is the end point of the Miraj to Kolhapur railway line. Kolhapur is the centre of trade for southern Maharashtra with electrification between Miraj and Kolhapur. This station connects Kolhapur with major cities such as Mumbai, Pune, Hyderabad, Ahmedabad, Delhi, and Dhanbad through express trains. Some important express trains are the Mahalaxmi Express (Kolhapur–Mumbai), Haripriya Express (Kolhapur–Tirupati), IRCTC also runs the tourist luxury train Deccan Odyssey at Kolhapur station. The Minister of Railways announced the Miraj–Kolhapur–Vaibhavwadi rail route and electrification of Kolhapur–Pune rail route in 2016–17. There are daily passenger shuttle services between Kolhapur, Miraj and Pune.

This railway station is named after Chatrapati Shahu Maharaj of Kolhapur.

Trains

Express/Mails

 CSMT Kolhapur–Ahmedabad Express
 Deekshabhoomi Express
 CSMT Kolhapur–Hazrat Nizamuddin Superfast Express
 Maharashtra Express
 Kalburgi–Kolhapur SCSMT Express
 Koyna Express 
 Mahalaxmi Express
 Haripriya Express
 Nagpur–CSMT Kolhapur Express
 NOTES:
† – Runs attached with Kolhapur–Gondia up to Bhusaval Junction.

Ordinary
 SCSMT Kolhapur–Pune DEMU
 SCSMT Kolhapur–Miraj DEMU
 SCSMT Kolhapur–Satara DEMU
 SCSMT Kolhapur–Sangli DEMU

References

External links
 Kolhapur Railway Station (Wikimedia)

Transport in Kolhapur
Railway stations in Kolhapur district
Buildings and structures in Kolhapur
Pune railway division
Railway terminus in India